A data steward is an oversight or data governance role within an organization, and is responsible for ensuring the quality and fitness for purpose of the organization's data assets, including the metadata for those data assets.  A data steward may share some responsibilities with a data custodian, such as the awareness, accessibility, release, appropriate use, security and management of data.  A data steward would also participate in the development and implementation of data assets.  A data steward may seek to improve the quality and fitness for purpose of other data assets their organization depends upon but is not responsible for.

Data stewards have a specialist role that utilizes an organization's data governance processes, policies, guidelines and responsibilities for administering an organizations' entire data in compliance with policy and/or regulatory obligations. The overall objective of a data steward is the data quality of the data assets, datasets, data records and data elements. This includes documenting metainformation for the data, such as definitions, related rules/governance, physical manifestation, and related data models (most of these properties being specific to an attribute/concept relationship), identifying owners/custodian's various responsibilities, relations insight  pertaining to attribute quality, aiding with project requirement data facilitation and documentation of capture rules.

Data stewards begin the stewarding process with the identification of the data assets and elements which they will steward, with the ultimate result being standards, controls and data entry.  The steward works closely with business glossary standards analysts (for standards), with data architect/modelers (for standards), with  DQ analysts (for controls) and with operations team members (good-quality data going in per business rules) while entering data.

Data stewardship roles are common when organizations attempt to exchange data precisely and consistently between computer systems and to reuse data-related resources.  Master data management often makes references to the need for data stewardship for its implementation to succeed. Data stewardship must have precise purpose, fit for purpose or fitness.

Data steward responsibilities
A data steward ensures that each assigned data element:
 Has clear and unambiguous data element definition
 Does not conflict with other data elements in the metadata registry (removes duplicates, overlap etc.)
 Has clear enumerated value definitions if it is of type Code
 Is still being used (remove unused data elements)
 Is being used consistently in various computer systems
 Is being used, fit for purpose = Data Fitness
 Has adequate documentation on appropriate usage and notes
 Documents the origin and sources of authority on each metadata element
 Is protected against unauthorised access or change

Responsibilities of data stewards vary between different organisations and institutions. For example, at Delft University of Technology, data stewards are perceived as the first contact point for any questions related to research data. They also have subject-specific background allowing them to easily connect with researchers and to contextualise data management problems to take into account disciplinary practices.

Types of data stewards

Depending on the set of data stewardship responsibilities assigned to an individual, there are 4 types (or dimensions of responsibility) of data stewards typically found within an organization:

 Data object data steward - responsible for managing reference data and attributes of one business data entity
 Business data steward - responsible for managing critical data, both reference and transactional, created or used by one business function. The data steward may also serve as a liaison between the organization's data users and technical teams, helping to bridge the gap between business needs and technical requirements. They may also play a role in educating others within the organization about best practices for data management, and advocating for data-driven decision-making.
 Process data steward - responsible for managing data across one business process
 System data steward - responsible for managing data for at least one IT system

Benefits of data stewardship

Systematic data stewardship can foster:

 Faster analysis
 Consistent use of data management resources
 Easy mapping of data between computer systems and exchange documents
 Lower costs associated with migration to (for example) Service Oriented Architecture (SOA)
 Mitigation of data risk
 Better control of dangers associated with privacy, legal, errors, etc.

Assignment of each data element to a person sometimes seems like an unimportant process. But many groups have found that users have greater trust and usage rates in systems where they can contact a person with questions on each data element.

Examples 

Delft University of Technology (TU Delft) offers an example of data stewardship implementation at a research institution. In 2017 the Data Stewardship Project was initiated at TU Delft to address research data management needs in a disciplinary manner across the whole campus. Dedicated data stewards with subject-specific background were appointed at every TU Delft faculty to support researchers with data management questions and to act as a linking point with the other institutional support services. The project is coordinated centrally by TU Delft Library, and it has its own website, blog and a YouTube channel.

The EPA metadata registry furnishes an example of data stewardship.  Note that each data element therein has a "POC"  (point of contact).

Data stewardship applications 
A new market for data governance applications is emerging, one in which both technical and business staff — stewards — manage policies. These new applications, like previous generations, deliver a strong business glossary capability, but they do not stop there. Vendors are introducing additional features addressing the roles of business in addition to technical stewards' concerns.

Information stewardship applications are business solutions used by business users acting in the role of information steward (interpreting and enforcing information governance policy, for example). These developing solutions represent, for the most part, an amalgam of a number of disparate, previously IT-centric tools already on the market, but are organized and presented in such a way that information stewards (a business role) can support the work of information policy enforcement as part of their normal, business-centric, day-to-day work in a range of use cases.

The initial push for the formation of this new category of packaged software came from operational use cases — that is, use of business data in and between transactional and operational business applications. This is where most of the master data management efforts are undertaken in organizations. However, there is also now a faster-growing interest in the new data lake arena for more analytical use cases.

Some of the vendors in Metadata Management, like Alation, have started highlighting the importance of Data Stewards to employees interested in using data to make business decisions.

See also
 Metadata
 Metadata registry
 Data curation
 Data element
 Data element definition
 Representation term
 ISO/IEC 11179

References

Further reading
 "Data Stewardship: An Actionable Guide to Effective Data Management and Data Governance" by David Plotkin, ‎ Morgan Kaufmann, 2013 
 "Information governance : concepts, strategies and best practices" by Robert F. Smallwood, Wiley, 2019
 Universal Meta Data Models, by David Marco and Michael Jennings, Wiley, 2004, page 93-94 
Metadata Solution by Adrinne Tannenbaum, Addison Wesley, 2002, page 412
 Building and Managing the Meta Data Repository, by David Marco, Wiley, 2000, pages 61–62
 The Data Warehouse Lifecycle Toolkit, by Ralph Kimball et. el., Wiley, 1998, also briefly mentions the role of data steward in the context of data warehouse project management on page 70.
 Developing Geospatial Intelligence Stewardship for Multinational Operations, by Jeff Thomas, US Army Command General Staff College, 2010, www.dtic.mil/dtic/tr/fulltext/u2/a524227.pdf.

Data management
Information technology governance
Knowledge representation
Library occupations
Metadata
Technical communication